Deer Park is an unincorporated community in Keener Township, Jasper County, Indiana.

Geography

References

Unincorporated communities in Jasper County, Indiana
Unincorporated communities in Indiana